Thomas Hatfield or Thomas de Hatfield (died 1381) was Bishop of Durham from 1345 to 1381 under King Edward III. He was one of the last warrior-bishops in England.

He was born around 1310, presumably in one of the several British towns named Hatfield. He entered the employment of the king (Edward III) on 26 October 1337.

Hatfield was Receiver of the Chamber when he was selected to be Lord Privy Seal in late 1344. He relinquished that office to his successor in July 1345.

Hatfield was elected on 8 May 1345 in succession to Richard de Bury, and was consecrated on 7 August 1345.

Thomas fought in King Edward's division at the Battle of Crécy on 26 August 1346.

In 1380, he drew up a covenant to leave £3000 to endow Durham College, Oxford, which was the primary endowment of the college and enabled the construction of its quadrangle, chapel and surviving library.

He died on 8 May 1381.

He is buried near the choir stalls in Durham Cathedral beneath the Bishop's Chair.

Due to his endowment of Durham College, Hatfield's arms appear in the canton of the arms of the University of Durham. Hatfield College, a constituent college of the university, is named after him.

Citations

References

 
 

Bishops of Durham
14th-century English Roman Catholic bishops
1381 deaths
Lords Privy Seal
Year of birth unknown